John Patrick McGowan, known as Paddy McGowan, is a politician in Northern Ireland.

McGowan worked in the fire service before joining the Social Democratic and Labour Party (SDLP).

In 1981, McGowan stood for the SDLP in Omagh District "C", but was not elected.  In 1985, he was elected in Mid Tyrone, and in 1989, he moved to represent Omagh Town.

McGowan was elected to the Northern Ireland Forum in 1996, representing West Tyrone.  He held his council seat in 1997, but left the SDLP in 1998, complaining that it had become too nationalist.

McGowan stood as an "Independent Community Candidate" at the 1998 Northern Ireland Assembly election, but did not come close to taking a seat.  Despite this, he held his council seat as an independent in 2001 and 2005.  He is the Chairman of Omagh Safer Streets, holds an MBE and is a Justice of the Peace.

References

External links
Personal website

Living people
Members of Omagh District Council
Members of the Northern Ireland Forum
Independent politicians in Northern Ireland
Social Democratic and Labour Party politicians
Year of birth missing (living people)